This is a list of awards and nominations received by D'banj, a Nigerian recording artist and harmonica player widely known for his contributions to the African Music Industry. Born and raised in Zaria, D'banj came to prominence following the release of his debut album No Long Thing (2005). He won the Best Newcomer award at the 2006 Channel O Music Video Awards for "Tongolo", a song off his aforementioned album. In 2005, D'banj won the Most Promising Male Artist award at the 2005 Kora Awards.

His follow-up album, RunDown Funk U Up (2006), included the hit single "Why Me" whose music video included the receipt of 1 Channel O Music Video Awards out of 3 nominations in 2007.

On May 23, 2010, and February 9, 2011, the Kokomaster released "Mr Endowed" and "Mr Endowed (Remix)" respectively. The former was nominated for Hottest Single of the Year at the 2011 Nigeria Entertainment Awards.  The music video for the former was nominated in the Best Afro Pop Video and Video of the Year categories at the 2010 Nigeria Music Video Awards (NMWA). Moreover, D'banj was nominated for the Best Use of Effects at the aforementioned awards for the music video. On the other hand, the music video for the latter won the Most Gifted Male Video award, and was nominated for Most Gifted Video of The Year at the 2011 Channel O Music Video Awards. It was also nominated for Best Afro Pop Video award at the 2011 Nigeria Music Video Awards (NMWA).

D'Kings Men, his 2013 compilation album, included the hit single "Oliver Twist". The music video for "Oliver Twist" won the Most Gifted Male Video and Most Gifted Video of the Year awards at the 2012 Channel O Music Video Awards. "Oliver Twist" won the Song of the Year award, and was nominated for Best Pop Single at The Headies 2012. D'banj received the Best Male West Africa nomination at the 2012 Kora Awards for "Oliver Twist". Furthermore, the song was nominated for Hottest Single of the Year at the 2012 Nigeria Entertainment Awards.

BET Awards

|-
|rowspan="1"|2011
|rowspan="1"|D'banj
|"Best International Act (Africa)"
|

Channel O Music Video Awards

|-
|rowspan="1"|2006
|rowspan="1"|D'banj for "Tongolo"
|"Best Newcomer"
|  
|-
|rowspan="3"|2007
|rowspan="3"|"Why Me"
|"Best Male Video"
|  
|-
|"Best African West Video"
|  
|-
|"Best Special Effects Video"   
|  
|-
|rowspan="1"|2008
|rowspan="1"|"Move Your Body"
|"Best African West Video"
| 
|-
|rowspan="1"|2010
|rowspan="1"|"Fall in Love"
|"Most Gifted Afro Pop"
|  
|-
|rowspan="2"|2011
|rowspan="2"|"Mr Endowed (Remix)"
|"Most Gifted Male Video"
|  
|-
|"Most Gifted Video Of The Year"
|  
|-
|rowspan="2"|2012
|rowspan="2"|"Oliver Twist"
|"Most Gifted Male Video"
|  
|-
|"Most Gifted Video of the Year"
| 
|-
|rowspan="1"|2013
|"Tony Montana (Bad Pass) Remix" (Naeto C featuring D'banj)
|Most Gifted Duo/Group/Featuring Video
|

Fizz Awards

|-
|rowspan="1"|2006
|rowspan="1"|D'banj for "Tongolo"
|"Best Newcomer"
|

Ghana Music Awards

|-
|rowspan="1"|2007
|rowspan="4"|D'banj
|rowspan="4"|"African Artiste of the Year"
|  
|-
|rowspan="1"|2009
|  
|-
|rowspan="1"|2012
|  
|-
|rowspan="1"|2013
|

The Headies

|-
|rowspan="1"|2006
|rowspan="1"|D'banj
|"Revelation of the Year"
|  
|-
|rowspan= "1"|2007
|rowspan="1"|Why Me"
|"Song of the Year"
|  
|-
|rowspan="1"|2008
|rowspan="1"|D'banj
|"Artiste of the Year"
|  
|-
|rowspan="4"|2009
|rowspan="1"|The Entertainer
|"Album of the Year"
|  
|-
|rowspan="1"|D'banj
|"Artiste of the Year"
| 
|-
|rowspan="1"|"Fall in Love"
|"Song of the Year"
| 
|-
|rowspan="1"|The Entertainer
|"Best R&B/Pop Album"
| 
|-
|rowspan="1"|2010
|rowspan="1"|"You Bad" (Wande Coal featuring D'banj)
|"Song of the Year"
|  
|-
|rowspan="3"|2011
|rowspan="1"|D'banj
|"Artiste Of The Year"
|  
|-
|rowspan="1"|"Pop Something" (Dr SID featuring D'banj)
|"Song of the Year"
| 
|-
|rowspan="1"|"Entertainer"
|"Best Pop Single"
|  
|-
|rowspan="3"|2012
|rowspan="1"|D'banj
|"Artiste Of The Year"
|  
|-
|rowspan="3"|"Oliver Twist"
|"Song of the Year"
|  
|-
|"Best Pop Single"
| 
|-
|rowspan="2"|2013
|"Best Music Video"
| 
|-
|"Tony Montana (Bad Pass) Remix" (Naeto C featuring D'banj)
|Best Collabo
| 
|-
|rowspan="2"|2016
|"Emergency
|"Best Pop Single"
| 
|-
|
|"Best Recording of the year"
|

Kora Awards

|-
|rowspan="1"|2005
|rowspan="1"|D'banj
|"Most Promising Male Artist"
|  
|-
|rowspan="1"|2012
|rowspan="1"|D'banj for "Oliver Twist"
|"Best Male West Africa"
|

MOBO Awards

|-
|rowspan="1"|2007
|rowspan="4"|D'banj
|rowspan="4"|"Best African Act"
|  
|-
|rowspan="1"|2008
|  
|-
|rowspan="1"|2011
|  
|-
|rowspan="1"|2012
|

MTV Africa Music Awards

|-
|rowspan="4"|2008
|rowspan="3"|D'banj
|"Best Artist of the Year"
|  
|-
|"Best Male Artist"
|  
|-
|"Best Live Performer"
|  
|-
|rowspan="1"|D'banj for "Why Me"
|"Listener's Choice Award" 
|  
|-
|rowspan="3"|2009
|rowspan="4"|D'banj
|"Best Artist of the Year"
|  
|-
|"Best Male Artist"
| 
|-
|"Best Performer"
| 
|-
|rowspan="1"|2010
|"Song Of The Year"
|

MTV Europe Music Awards

|-
|rowspan="1"|2007
|rowspan="2"|D'banj
|rowspan="3"|"Best African Act"
| 
|-
|rowspan="1"|2012
|

Nigeria Entertainment Awards

|-
|rowspan="2"|2007
|rowspan="1"|"Why Me"
|"Hottest Single of the Year"
|  
|-
|rowspan="1"|D'banj
|"Best Afro Pop Act of the Year"
|  
|-
|rowspan="2"|2009
|rowspan="1"|The Entertainer
|rowspan="1"|"Best Album of the Year"
|  
|-
|rowspan="1"|"Suddenly"
|rowspan="1"|"Best Music Video of the Year"
|  
|-
|rowspan="2"|2010
|rowspan="1"|"You Bad" (Wande Coal featuring D'banj)
|"Hottest Single of the Year"
|  
|-
|rowspan="1"|"Fall in Love" (D'banj and Sesan)
|"Best Male Music Video of the Year (Artist & Director)"
| 
|-
|rowspan="2"|2011
|rowspan="1"|"Mr Endowed"
|"Hottest Single of the Year"
|  
|-
|rowspan="1"|D'banj
|"Best Pop/R&B Artist of the Year"
|  
|-
|rowspan="2"|2012
|rowspan="1"|"Oliver Twist"
|"Hottest Single of the Year"
|  
|-
|rowspan="1"|D'banj
|"Best Entertainment Personality"
|

Nigeria Music Video Awards (NMVA)

|-
|rowspan="1"|2009
|rowspan="1|"Gbono Feli Feli"
|"Best Afro Pop Video"
|  
|-
|rowspan="3"|2010
|rowspan="1"|"Mr Endowed"
|"Best Afro Pop Video"
|  
|-
|rowspan="1"| D'banj for "Mr Endowed"
|"Best Use of Effects"
| 
|-
|rowspan="1"|"Mr Endowed"
|"Video of the Year"
| 
|-
|rowspan="1"|2011
|rowspan="1"|"Mr Endowed (Remix)"
|"Best Afro Pop Video"
|  
|-
|rowspan="1"|2012
|"Tony Montana (Bad Pass) Remix" (Naeto C featuring D'banj)
|"Best Afro Hip Hop"
| 
|-
|rowspan="3"|2013
|rowspan="3"|"Don't Tell Me Nonsense"
|"Video of the Year"
| 
|-
|"Best Afro Pop Video"
| 
|-
|"Best Use of Choreography"
|N/A

Sound City Music Video Awards

|-
|rowspan="6"|2008
|rowspan="5"|"Move Your Body"
|"Best Male Video"
| 
|-
|"Best R&B/Pop Video"
|  
|-
|"Best Special Effect/Editing"
|  
|-
|"Best Video"
|  
|-
|"Best Cinematography" 
|  
|-
|rowspan="1"|"Booty Call" (Mo' Hits All Stars)
|"Soundcity Fresh Video"
|  
|-
|rowspan="5"|2009
|"Suddenly"
|"Soundcity Viewers Choice"
|  
|-
|"Ten Ten" (Mo' Hits All Stars)
|"Best Special Effect Editing"
| 
|-
|"Pere" (Mo' Hits All Stars)
|"Best Duo/Group Video"
| 
|-
|"Wind am Well" (Ikechukwu  featuring D'banj)
|"Best Collaboration in a Music Video"
| 
|-
|"Pere" (Mo' Hits All Stars)
|"Best Video"
| 
|-
|rowspan="1"|2010
|"Mr Endowed"
|"Soundcity Fresh Video"
|  
|}

World Music Awards 

|-
|rowspan="5"|2014
|rowspan="3"|D'banj
|"World’s Best Male Artist"
|  
|-
|"World's Best Entertainer of the Year"
| 
|-
|"Best-selling African Artist"
|
|-
|rowspan="2"|"Oliver Twist"
|"World’s Best Song"
| 
|-
|"World’s Best Video"
|

4Syte TV Music Video Awards

|-
|rowspan="1"|2013
|"Don't Tell Me Nonsense"
|rowspan="3"|"Best African Act Video"
|   
|-
|2012
|"Oliver Twist"
|
|-
|2011
|"Mr Endowed Remix"
|

References

D'banj
D'banj